Spring Valley Township is a township in Dallas County, Iowa, USA.  As of the 2000 census, its population was 8,204.

Geography
According to the USGS, it contains five cemeteries: Highview Memorial Gardens, Mowrer, Saint Patrick's, Valleyview and Violet Hill.

The streams of Bucks Branch, Elm Branch, Frog Creek and Swan Lake Branch run through this township.

Transportation
Spring Valley Township contains one airport, Perry Municipal Airport.

References
 USGS Geographic Names Information System (GNIS)

External links
 US-Counties.com
 City-Data.com

Townships in Dallas County, Iowa
Townships in Iowa